Zorrilla is a Spanish surname. Notable people with the surname include:

People 
China Zorrilla (1922–2014), Uruguayan actress, director and writer
Francisco de Rojas Zorrilla (1607–1648), Spanish dramatist
Jonathan Zorrilla (b. 1992), footballer
José Zorrilla (1817–1893), Spanish writer 
Juan Zorrilla de San Martín (1855–1931), Uruguayan poet 
Julie Zorrilla, American Idol contestant
Manuel Ruiz Zorrilla (1833–1895), Spanish Prime Minister
Raúl Zorrilla, pseudonym of Emilio Vieyra
Zorrilla Ozuna (b. 1954), lawyer, politician, and general

Places 
 Zorrilla Theatre

Spanish-language surnames